Thomas W. White (November 15, 1805January 9, 1884) was a Michigan politician.

Early life
White was born on November 15, 1805. In 1836, White settled in Grand Haven, Michigan.

Career
In Grand Haven, White worked as a lumberjack. On November 6, 1843, White was elected to the Michigan House of Representatives where he represented the Ottawa County district from January 1, 1844 to March 12, 1844. At first, White was a Whig, but later, he became a Republican. After 30 years of living in Grand Haven, White moved to Grand Rapids, Michigan.

Personal life
White married Caroline Norton and had three children. White was the uncle of United States Senator Thomas White Ferry.

Death
White died on January 9, 1884.

References

1805 births
1884 deaths
Michigan Whigs
Michigan Republicans
People from Ashfield, Massachusetts
People from Grand Haven, Michigan
People from Grand Rapids, Michigan
Members of the Michigan House of Representatives
19th-century American politicians